The Anghel Saligny Bridge (formerly King Carol I Bridge) is a complex of two railroad truss bridges in Romania,  across the Danube River and the Borcea branch of the Danube, connecting the regions of Muntenia and Dobruja. The bridge is listed in the National Register of Historic Monuments.

History
The bridge was designed by the Romanian engineer Anghel Saligny. The two cities on the banks of the river which was built were Fetești on the left side, located on the Borcea branch of the Danube, and Cernavodă on the right side, located on the main branch of the Danube.

Between the two bridges there was a  viaduct over the Balta Ialomiței island, with 34 spans of  each.

The entire bridge was inaugurated on 26 September 1895, and as a test on the opening, a convoy of 15 whistling locomotives sped at 60 km/h, followed by a train reserved for 'guests', at 80 km/h.

In the 1960s, after large parts of the Balta Ialomiței island were reclaimed for agriculture, the original viaduct over it was replaced with an embankment.

Anghel Saligny Bridge complex has been exclusively used for almost a century, until 1987, when the new Cernavodă Bridge complex, built next to it, was inaugurated.

Gallery

See also

CFR Line 800 (Bucharest - Mangalia)
Cernavodă Bridge
List of bridges in Romania

References

External links

King Carol I Bridge at Structurae
Bridge over the Borcea Branch at Structurae
The history of the Romanian Danube bridges (14 figures available) at Semantic Scholar

Bridges in Romania
Railway bridges in Romania
Bridges over the Danube
Bridges completed in 1895
Buildings and structures in Constanța County
Buildings and structures in Ialomița County
Historic monuments in Constanța County
Historic monuments in Ialomița County